The International Federation of Professional and Technical Engineers (IFPTE), AFL–CIO & CLC is a North American labor union representing various professional, technical, and administrative support workers in the United States and Canada, in both the public and private sectors.

Its roots may be traced back to the International Federation of Draftsmen's Unions, a craft union for shipyard engineers and draftsmen, chartered by the American Federation of Labor in 1918, and expanding its jurisdiction in 1919 to become the International Federation of Technical Engineers, Architects, and Draftsman's Union.

References

External links 

International Federation of Professional and Technical Engineers website

1918 establishments in the United States
AFL–CIO
American engineering organizations
Canadian Labour Congress
Engineering societies
Organizations based in Washington, D.C.
Trade unions established in 1918
Trade unions in the United States